Sassocorvaro is a frazione of the comune (municipality) of Sassocorvaro Auditore in the Province of Pesaro e Urbino in the Italian region Marche, located about  west of Ancona and about  southwest of Pesaro. It was a separate comune until 31 December 2018.

Main sights

Rocca Ubaldinesca, a Renaissance fortification designed by Francesco di Giorgio Martini. During World War II, it was used to house works of art from all Italy in order to prevent they were stolen by the German occupation force.
 Downstream of the town, in the Mercatale valley,  is an artificial lake originated by the construction of a dam that blocks the flow of the river Foglia. The dam was built in the 1950s. The water of the lake is conveyed by gravity in a turbine for the generation of electricity.

References

Cities and towns in the Marche
Frazioni of the Province of Pesaro and Urbino